Balyun is a Syrian village located in Ihsim Nahiyah in Ariha District, Idlib. According to the Syria Central Bureau of Statistics (CBS), Balyun had a population of 6,030 in the 2004 census.

Syrian civil war 
On 27 February 2020, the Syrian and Russian air forces struck a Turkish Armed Forces position in Balyun, killing at least 34 Turkish soldiers. Following the northwestern offensive, the town became mostly deserted, due to heavy aerial bombardment and artillery fire.

References 

Populated places in Ariha District